Milton Gate Marsh is a  biological Site of Special Scientific Interest north-west of Eastbourne in East Sussex.

This site consists of two areas of alluvial wetland in the valleys of the River Cuckmere and one of its tributaries. There is a rich variety of invertebrates, including seventeen nationally scarce species such as the sallow clearwing moth and the beetles Ochthebius exaratus and Stenolphus skrimshiranus.

References

Sites of Special Scientific Interest in East Sussex